The Fenn Street Gang is a British television sitcom which ran for three seasons between 1971 and 1973. Created by John Esmonde and Bob Larbey, it was a spin-off from their popular Please Sir! series.

Synopsis
The series follows the lives of many of the pupils from Fenn Street School as they enter the world of work. Some episodes were written by Geoff Rowley and Andy Baker, as well as David Barry and Tony Bilbow. The series' stars were Peter Cleall, Carol Hawkins (who also replaced Penny Spencer as Sharon in the 1971 Please Sir! film), David Barry, Peter Denyer and Liz Gebhardt.

Leon Vitali replaced Malcolm McFee as Peter Craven during the first series, although Malcolm took this role back for the second and third series'. Peter Denyer (Dennis Dunstable) and Liz Gebhardt (Maureen Bullock) were absent from the third (and final) series. John Alderton (Mr Hedges, their form-master in Please Sir!) guest-appeared in three episodes of the first series of The Fenn Street Gang and the first two episodes from the final series of Please Sir!, which ran alongside The Fenn Street Gang in transmission dates. Richard Davies, who played science teacher Mr Price in Please Sir!, also appeared again as Mr Price in one episode of series one.

The series ran for two years and 47 episodes, but proved not as popular as its progenitor and was axed.

Production
The first season, consisting of twenty-one episodes, was produced by London Weekend Television at Wembley Studios in north-west London. Seasons two and three, consisting of eighteen and eight episodes respectively, were recorded at LWT's newly constructed South Bank Television Centre (also known as Kent House).

Episodes

Sequel
Bowler (1973) was a 13-episode spin-off series following The Fenn Street Gang crime boss Stanley Bowler, played by George Baker.

DVD releases
All three series of The Fenn Street Gang have been released on DVD.

References

External links

1971 British television series debuts
1973 British television series endings
1970s British sitcoms
English-language television shows
ITV sitcoms
British television spin-offs
London Weekend Television shows